The Wide World Over is a 40th anniversary, greatest hits-like compilation by the Irish musical group The Chieftains. It gathers tracks from The Chieftains in China until Water from the Well, as well as four new releases.

Charts

References

2002 greatest hits albums
The Chieftains albums
RCA Records compilation albums